Beth O'Leary is an English author of romantic comedy novels. Her first novel The Flatshare, published in 2019, sold over a million copies and was nominated for a Comedy Women in print prize. Since then she has written three more books including: The Switch, The Road Trip and The No-Show.

Life and career
O'Leary was born in the 1990s and considers Winchester her home town. She graduated from Oxford University and lived in London for a few years before moving back to Winchester. She wrote her debut novel whilst commuting between Winchester and her job in London. She gave birth to her first baby in July 2021. The Flatshare is being adapted as a comedy series for Paramount Plus and The Switch is being adapted into a film by Amblin Pictures.

Bibliography
The Flatshare (2019)
The Switch (2020)
The Road Trip (2021)
The No-Show (2022)

References

Alumni of the University of Oxford
Living people
Writers from Winchester
Women romantic fiction writers
English romantic fiction writers
English women novelists
Year of birth missing (living people)